The Game Plan was an Australian sports television program focused on the Australian Football League, it premiered on One on 23 March 2011. The final episode aired on 14 June 2012 with similar AFL-dedicated program Before the Game moving into its former timeslot following its cancellation.

Hosts
Wayne Carey
Scott Cummings
Mark Howard

See also
 List of Australian television series

References

10 Bold original programming
2011 Australian television series debuts
2012 Australian television series endings
English-language television shows
Australian rules football television series
Television articles with incorrect naming style